The Translator is a feature film directed by Rana Kazkaz and Anas Khalaf. The film was produced with the support of Doha Film Institute's financing grants and has won many awards including the Cannes Film Festival's L'Atelier de la Cinefondation in 2017, the CNC Award at the Istanbul Film Festival's Meetings on the Bridge in 2017, and a Tribeca Alumni Grant in 2018 amongst others.

Logline 
A Syrian exile living in Australia returns when his brother is taken into custody by the Assad regime in 2011.

Awards

References 

2020 thriller drama films
Films set in Syria